Bumi Sriwijaya Stadium or Stadion Bumi Sriwijaya is a multi-purpose stadium in Palembang, South Sumatra, Indonesia.  It is currently used mostly for football matches. It is the host of PS Palembang and Sriwijaya FC. The stadium has a capacity of 15,000 spectators and after its renovation in 2017 the capacity was decreased into 6,000 spectators and all seater. The Stadium Serves as one of the Venue for Women's Football in 2018 Asian Games.

Access
The stadium is located in the middle of the city and surrounded by malls and hospital.  Public transportation access to the stadium includes:
 Palembang Light Rail Transit 
 Trans Musi PS Mall – Plaju Route
 Angkot Perumnas – Ampera Bridge Route

References

External links
Stadium picture 

Buildings and structures in South Sumatra
Multi-purpose stadiums in Indonesia
Football venues in Indonesia
Athletics (track and field) venues in Indonesia
Sports venues in South Sumatra
Football venues in South Sumatra
Athletics (track and field) venues in South Sumatra
Multi-purpose stadiums in South Sumatra
Sports venues in Palembang
Football venues in Palembang
Athletics (track and field) venues in Palembang
Post-independence architecture of Indonesia
Venues of the 2018 Asian Games
Asian Games football venues